is a railway station located in the city of Kitaakita, Akita Prefecture, Japan, operated by the third sector railway operator Akita Nairiku Jūkan Railway.

Lines

Station layout
The station consists of two side platforms serving two tracks, connected to the station building by a level crossing. The three-story station building also incorporates a hot spring spa.  The station is staffed.

Platforms

Adjacent stations

History
Ani-Maeda Station opened on November 15, 1935, as a station on the Japanese Government Railways serving the village of Maeda, Akita. The line was extended on to Aniai Station by September 25, 1936. The line was privatized on November 1, 1986, becoming the Akita Nairiku Jūkan Railway

The station was renamed Ani-Maeda Onsen Station on March 13, 2021.

Surrounding area

References

External links

 Akita Nairiku Railway station information 

Railway stations in Japan opened in 1935
Railway stations in Akita Prefecture
Kitaakita